The 1992–93 UC Irvine Anteaters men's basketball team represented the University of California, Irvine during the 1992–93 NCAA Division I men's basketball season. The Anteaters were led by second year head coach Rod Baker and played at the Bren Events Center. They were members of the Big West Conference.

Previous season 
Under first year head coach Rod Baker, the 1991–92 UC Irvine Anteaters men's basketball team finished the season with a record of 7–22 and 3–15 in Big West play.

Roster

Schedule

|-
!colspan=9 style=|Regular Season

|-
!colspan=9 style=| Big West Conference tournament

Source

Awards and honors
Shaun Battle
Big West All-Freshman Team

Source:

References

UC Irvine Anteaters men's basketball seasons
UC Irvine
UC Irvine Anteaters
UC Irvine Anteaters